Eliot Stellar (November 1, 1919 – October 12, 1993) was an American a physiological psychologist noted for his research of the physiological processes of the brain and how they affect motivation and behavior.

The National Academy of Sciences called him "one of the founders of ... behavioral neuroscience".
Stellar was a provost at the University of Pennsylvania, a member of the National Academy of Sciences and the president of the Academy's the Human Rights Committee, president of the Eastern Psychological Association, president of the American Philosophical Society,
a recipient of the Warren Medal of the Society of Experimental Physiologists and of the American Psychological Foundation's Gold Medal for Lifetime Achievement.

Chronology 
 November 1, 1919: born in Boston, Massachusetts
 1941: graduated from Harvard University
 1942: M.S., Brown University
 1947: Ph.D., Brown University
 1947-1960: faculty positions at Johns Hopkins University
 1960-1965: professor of physiological psychology, Department of Anatomy, the University of Pennsylvania
 1967: the Warren Medal of the Society of Experimental Physiologists 
 1965-1973: director of the Institute of Neurological Sciences, the University of Pennsylvania
 1973-1978: provost, the University of Pennsylvania
 1990, at age 70,  Chair of the Department of Anatomy, University of Pennsylvania
 1993: the American Psychological Foundation's Gold Medal for Lifetime Achievement
 1993 dies of cancer at the University Medical Center in Philadelphia

References 

1919 births
1993 deaths
20th-century American psychologists
University of Pennsylvania faculty
Johns Hopkins University faculty
Brown University alumni
Harvard University alumni
Members of the United States National Academy of Sciences
People from Boston
Members of the National Academy of Medicine